Robert Weisbuch is an American academic administrator and professor. He served as the eleventh President of Drew University from 2005 to 2012.

Biography
Weisbuch received a B.A. from Wesleyan University and a Ph.D. from Yale University. He spent 25 years at the University of Michigan, where he served as chair of the Department of English, associate vice president for research, associate dean for faculty programs, and interim dean of the Horace H. Rackham School of Graduate Studies. He then served as President of the Woodrow Wilson National Fellowship Foundation for seven years. In 2005, he became the eleventh President of Drew University 

On May 2, 2012, Weisbuch announced plans to leave his position as of June 30, 2012 to devote more time to writing and scholarship. He is a member of EDUCAUSE.

Bibliography
Emily Dickinson's Poetry (1975)
Atlantic Double-Cross: American Literature and British Influence in the Age of Emerson (1989)
Numerous essays on liberal arts and academia in Chronicle of Higher Education and elsewhere

References

Living people
Wesleyan University alumni
Yale University alumni
University of Michigan faculty
Presidents of Drew University
Year of birth missing (living people)